UDL may refer to:

Universal Data Link, a file format storing information about database connections
Universal Design for Learning, an educational framework
University of Lleida (Universitat de Lleida), a university in Lleida, Spain
Urban debate league, a high school debate teams group in the United States
User defined literals, ways to customize literals in C++ programming language since C++11.